Roger Thomas Hanlon (born May 17, 1947) is an American marine biologist, ethologist, and senior scientist at the Marine Biological Laboratory, as well as a professor in the Department of Ecology and Evolutionary Biology at Brown University. He is known for his research on the behavior of cephalopods, particularly their camouflage abilities.

References

External links
Faculty page

Living people
American marine biologists
Ethologists
Brown University faculty
University of Miami alumni
Scientists from Cincinnati
1947 births
Camouflage researchers